Paris Mohan Kumar is an UNESCO honored artist and environmental activist from Mahe, Kerala, India.

Early career
Mohan Kumar began his art pursuits in Puducherry, India and later moved to Paris. In 1988, he was listed by UNESCO as one of the 40 greatest artists in the world.

References

Indian painters
Indian activists